Gregoire River is a stream in Alberta, Canada.

Gregoire River has the name of a pioneer citizen.

See also
List of rivers of Alberta

References

Rivers of Alberta